Mykola Stsiborskyi, also may be spelled Stsiborsky, Stsyborsky, Ściborski, or Sciborski (28 March, 1898 – August 30, 1941) was a Ukrainian nationalist politician who served on the Provid, or central leadership council of the Organization of Ukrainian Nationalists (OUN), and who was its chief theorist.  He sided with Andriy Melnyk when the OUN split into two hostile factions, and was likely murdered by followers of Melnyk's rival Stepan Bandera.

Biography 

Mykola Stsiborskyi was born in Zhytomyr, Volhynian Governorate, Ukraine (then part of the Russian empire) to the family of a tsarist army officer.  He grew up in Kyiv.  During World War I, Stsiborskyi served in the Russian army as a captain.  He was wounded twice and was awarded the Order of Saint Anna 3rd and 4th degrees, St. Stanislav of 3 degrees and Cross of St. George, 4th degree.   After World War I, during the Russian Civil War, Stsiborskyi served as a captain in the cavalry of the army of the Ukrainian People's Republic which had fought to establish an independent Ukrainian state against the Soviet forces.   Following the war he emigrated to Prague where he studied economics and engineering, joining the Ukrainian Military Organization and later the Organization of Ukrainian Nationalists.  A gifted writer, he became quite influential within the OUN as its principal theorist. Stsiborskyi was one of eight members of the OUN's Provid, or leadership council, that in the 1930s had been based in Rome.

In 1939, while the OUN was preparing for its Second Congress, Stsiborskyi was assisted by Yaroslav Stetsko, a close ally of Stepan Bandera.  Stetsko was relieved of his duties by Stsiborskyi due to allegations that he was unable to properly fulfill his duties.  This act may have contributed to the deterioration between Bandera's followers and the Provid which would lead to the split within the OUN. Prior to the split Bandera's group demanded that Stsiborskyi and two others be removed from the Provid, a demand that was ignored by the OUN leader Andrii Melnyk.

Assassination

After Germany invaded the Soviet Union Stsiborskyi returned to the city of his birth, Zhytomir, which was then under German administration.  In 1941 the Melnyk faction of the OUN of which Stsiborskyi was a significant leader became involved in stimulating a rebirth in Ukrainian culture in Zhytomir, the first major Ukrainian town east of the 1939 Soviet border that had been captured by German forces. Prosvita societies were founded, Ukrainian-language broadcasts were produced, two new secondary schools and a pedagogical institute were founded, and a school administration was established. Many locals were recruited into the OUN-M.  The OUN-M also organized police forces, recruited from Soviet prisoners of war.  Stsiborskyi and Senyk, another member of the OUN-M's Provid, came to Zhytomir in order to direct the OUN-M's efforts to secure eastern Ukraine.  On August 30, however, after having attended a meeting of the regional police, they were both gunned down and killed by Stephan Kozyi, a person from West Ukraine who was himself immediately killed by German and Ukrainian police.  The anti-Melnyk Bandera faction of the OUN was strongly implicated in Stsiborskyi's assassination, although it has denied its involvement.  An earlier article had declared that Bandera promised that Senyk and Stsiborskyi would be the first people whom he would destroy in the Ukrainian lands, the OUN-B had issued a secret directive forbidding OUN-M's leaders from entering eastern Ukraine (Melnyk referred to this document as a "death sentence"), and immediately after the assassination leaflets were distributed in Kyiv by Bandera's followers that justified the act.  The assassination resulted in a bloody crackdown on Bandera's followers by the German authorities. Prominent Ukrainian nationalist writers Olena Teliha and Oleh Olzhych denounced Bandera's faction of the OUN for this assassination.

Political and social ideas 

Stsiborskyi was the principal theorist of the OUN prior to its split into the hostile Melnyk and Bandera camps. He believed that the idea of democracy that began to spread throughout the world following the French Revolution had reached its high point prior to World War I and subsequently came into decline.  He wrote that democracy and capitalism were inseparable, and that the two systems helped bring about much material progress and innovation throughout the nineteenth century. He also saw them as fundamentally flawed. Stsiborskyi felt that democracy and capitalism required equal rights and freedoms while, at the same time, nature was inherently not equal. With time, the weak were bound by the capitalist system to become enslaved by the strong and the democratic slogans of universal brotherhood were considered by Stsiborskyi to be merely sentimental and empty phrases.  The reality in a democracy, according to Stsiborskyi, was that political rights and social control existed in direct proportion to economic power.  Democracy thus became a playground for competing groups, each promoting its own interests rather than those of the nation as a whole.  These interests vie for votes, and employ bribery and corruption. For these reasons, Stsiborskyi felt that ultimately the most creative, talented, and best elements in a democratic society retreat from politics in disgust. 

Stsiborskyi considered socialism and communism to be identical in their theories and worldview, and wrote that both were flawed reactions to democracy's failures. He rejected their emphasis on the Proletariat (working class) and claimed that socialism, as well as communism, inevitably leads to a dictatorship in favor of one social group at the expense of others in the nation.

In opposition to democracy, socialism and communism, Stsiborskyi admired Italy's fascism.  In contrast to Democracy's "liberty, equality, fraternity" Stsiborsky praised Fascism's "duty, hierarchy, discipline". Stsiborskyi wrote that society should be organized according to the principles of national syndicalism, a socioeconomic system adopted by Benito Mussolini. Instead of competing political parties or social classes he proposed that an authoritarian one-party government should harmoniously unite all social groups under its control, which would prevent exploitation of some classes by others and would focus all of the nation's social elements onto the goal of national development rather than on the development of particular groups such as social classes.  Stsiborskyi supported a fascist dictatorship which he claimed represented a "cult of creativity" in opposition to democracy's "cult of numbers/votes." He rejected the old traditional elite in favor of a new one, arising from the people, characterized by its genius and willpower. Stsiborski's major work, Natiocracy, included a chapter criticizing Hitler's dictatorship.  He also criticized Dmytro Dontsov, referring to him as a "swindler, panic-monger, and morally spineless speculator."  

Stsiborskyi was married to a Jewish woman  and in his writings opposed antisemitism.  An article he wrote in 1930 in an official organ of the OUN, denounced the anti-Jewish pogroms that occurred in Ukraine during the time of the Russian Civil War, stating that most of its victims were innocent and not Bolsheviks. Stsiborskyi wrote that Jewish rights should be respected, that the OUN ought to convince Jews that their organization was no threat to them, and that Ukrainians ought to maintain close contacts with Jews nationally and internationally.  An internal German memo attributed the deterioration in the relationship between Germany and the OUN between 1933 and 1937 in part to Stsiborskyi having a Jewish wife.

Notes 

1898 births
1941 deaths
Politicians from Zhytomyr
People from Zhitomirsky Uyezd
Russian military personnel of World War I
Ukrainian people of World War I
Ukrainian people of World War II
Ukrainian politicians before 1991
Organization of Ukrainian Nationalists politicians
Organization of Ukrainian Nationalists
Ukrainian nationalists
Victims of the Organization of Ukrainian Nationalists
Recipients of the Order of St. Anna, 3rd class
Recipients of the Order of St. Anna, 4th class
Recipients of the Order of Saint Stanislaus (Russian), 3rd class
Recipients of the Cross of St. George